Roojai Online Insurance is a Thai (previously Indonesian) registered UCI Continental cycling team established in 2020. For its first year of existence, the team held amateur status, before upgrading to Continental in 2021.

Team roster

Major wins
2023
 Overall Tour of Sharjah, Adne van Engelen
Stage 4, Adne van Engelen
Stage 5, Lucas Carstensen
 Stage 5 New Zealand Cycle Classic, Lucas Carstensen

National champions
2023
 Thailand Under-23 Road Race, Kongphob Thimachai
 Thailand Under-23 Time Trial, Kongphob Thimachai

References

UCI Continental Teams (Asia)
Cycling teams established in 2020
Cycling teams based in Thailand
Cycling teams based in Indonesia